Mark Neave (born 11 February 1980) is an English cricketer.  Neave is a right-handed batsman who bowls right-arm off break.  He was born at Kettering, Northamptonshire.

Neave represented the Northamptonshire Cricket Board in a single List A match against the Leicestershire Cricket Board in the 1st round of the 2002 Cheltenham & Gloucester Trophy which was played in 2001.  In his only List A match he scored 11 runs.

References

External links
Mark Neave at Cricinfo
Mark Neave at CricketArchive

1980 births
Living people
Sportspeople from Kettering
English cricketers
Northamptonshire Cricket Board cricketers